Mona Ahmad Abdulaziz Hassanein (born November 11, 1985), is an Egyptian fencer. She competed at the 2012 Summer Olympics in the Women's épée, but was defeated in the first round.

References

Egyptian female épée fencers
Living people
Olympic fencers of Egypt
Fencers at the 2012 Summer Olympics
1985 births
20th-century Egyptian women
21st-century Egyptian women